An active center (sometimes called active site or kinetic-chain carrier) in polymer science refers to the site on a chain carrier at which reaction occurs.

References

Polymerization reactions